Juhan Mettis (born 19 June 1990) is an Estonian judoka.

He was born in Tartu. In 2014 he graduated from the University of Tartu's Institute of Physical Education.

He started his judo training in 1997, coached by Riina Tormis; later his coach was Andres Põhjala. He won silver medal at 2009 European Junior Judo Championships. He has also competed at European Judo Championships. He is multiple-times Estonian champion. 2009–2017 he was  a member of Estonian national judo team.

In 2015 he was named as Best Male Judoka of Estonia.

References

Living people
1990 births
Estonian male judoka
University of Tartu alumni
Sportspeople from Tartu
European Games competitors for Estonia
Judoka at the 2015 European Games
21st-century Estonian people
Universiade medalists in judo
Universiade silver medalists for Estonia
Medalists at the 2015 Summer Universiade
Medalists at the 2017 Summer Universiade